Hervé Ebanda (born 14 February 1979 in Créteil, France) is a French former professional footballer who played as a forward on the professional level for the French Ligue 2 US Créteil-Lusitanos football club between 2000 and 2002.

References

External links
 Hervé Ebanda  FCM Aubervilliers 
 
 

1979 births
Living people
French footballers
Association football forwards